Mel Rudd (28 February 1914 – 19 March 1994) was an  Australian rules footballer who played with Fitzroy in the Victorian Football League (VFL).		

Rudd was recruited from the Wagga Australian Rules Football League club, Collingullie, in 1935.

Notes

External links 
		

1914 births
1994 deaths
Australian rules footballers from New South Wales
Fitzroy Football Club players